Gerrardstown Historic District is a national historic district located at Gerrardstown, Berkeley County, West Virginia. It encompasses 92 contributing buildings, 4 contributing sites, and 2 contributing structures. Notable commercial buildings include the Gerrardstown Corner Store (c. 1900), Wiest Antiques Store (c. 1900), Richard McCormick Store, Charles Crim Store, and David S. Griffith General Store.  Most houses are 2 1/2 stories and are representative of a number of popular architectural styles including Queen Anne, Federal, and Greek Revival. Religious properties include the Presbyterian Church (1893) and Cemetery and Southern Methodist Episcopal Church (1883).  Also included is the Lutheran Cemetery with burials dating to 1818. Located within the district is the separately listed Hays-Gerrard House.

It was listed on the National Register of Historic Places in 1991.

References

Queen Anne architecture in West Virginia
Federal architecture in West Virginia
Greek Revival architecture in West Virginia
Historic districts in Berkeley County, West Virginia
Historic districts on the National Register of Historic Places in West Virginia
National Register of Historic Places in Berkeley County, West Virginia